This is a list of seasons completed by the Buffalo Sabres of the National Hockey League. This list documents the records and playoff results for all seasons the Sabres have completed in the NHL since their inception in 1970.

Table key

Year by year

1 Between 1974–75 and 1980–81, Conference championships were awarded to the team that finished first overall in their respective conference in the regular season.
2 Season was shortened due to the 1994–95 NHL lockout.
3 Season was cancelled due to the 2004–05 NHL lockout.
4 As of the 2005–06 NHL season, all games tied after regulation will be decided in a shootout; SOL (Shootout losses) will be recorded as OTL in the standings.
5 The 2012–13 NHL season was shortened due to the 2012–13 NHL lockout.
6 The 2019–20 NHL season was suspended on March 12, 2020 due to the COVID-19 pandemic.
7 The 2020–21 NHL season was shortened due to the COVID-19 pandemic.

All-time records

References

Buffalo Sabres seasons
Buffalo Sabres
seasons